Snowboarding at the 2018 Winter Olympics was held at the Bokwang Phoenix Park in Pyeongchang, South Korea. A total of ten snowboarding events were scheduled to take place between 10 and 24 February 2018.

The parallel slalom event, which made its debut four years earlier at the 2014 Winter Olympics in Sochi, was dropped from the games in 2018 in favour of a new big air event.

Qualification

A total of 258 quota spots were available to athletes to compete at the games (142 men and 116 women). Each National Olympic Committee was permitted to enter a maximum of 26 athletes, with a maximum of 14 men or 14 women. Each event had its own maximum number of quota spots, however slopestyle and big air were calculated jointly per nation.

Competition schedule
The following was the competition schedule for all ten events.

Sessions that included the event finals are shown in bold.

All times are (UTC+9).

Medal summary

Medal table

Men's events

Women's events

Participating nations
A total of 248 athletes from 30 nations (including the IOC's designation of Olympic Athletes from Russia) were scheduled to participate (the numbers of athletes are shown in parentheses).

References

External links
Official Results Book – Snowboarding

 
2018 Winter Olympics events
2018
2018 in snowboarding
Snowboarding in South Korea